Ystrad Rhondda railway station is a railway station serving Ystrad in Rhondda Cynon Taf, Wales. It is located on the Rhondda Line. Alphabetically, it is the last station in the UK with the first being Abbey Wood station in southeast London.

History

Services
Monday-Saturday, there is a half-hourly service to   &  southbound and to  northbound. On 20 July 2018, previous franchise operator Arriva Trains Wales announced a trial period of extra Sunday services on the Rhondda Line to Cardiff and Barry Island. This was in response to a survey by Leanne Wood and the success of extra Sunday services on the Merthyr Line and the Rhymney Line.

References

External links 

Railway stations in Rhondda Cynon Taf
DfT Category F1 stations
Railway stations opened by British Rail
Railway stations in Great Britain opened in 1986
Railway stations served by Transport for Wales Rail